Tory Shepherd is an opinion writer and journalist best known for her contributions to Australian News Limited media publications and websites, including The Advertiser and The Punch. She has also served as Acting Editor for the latter. She has worked as Political Editor at The Advertiser, as a senior reporter at news.com.au and as a panelist on the ABC TV discussion program, Insiders. She joined News Limited in 2006, starting with a cadetship at The Advertiser. She also appeared in Episode 6 of The Chaser's Media Circus, which aired in 2014. Shepherd has been a panelist at a number of events in the Behind the Headlines series of public forums, hosted by Paul Willis at RiAus, and is a member of the Mindframe media advisory group. She has described her main interests as "social justice, religion, and dodgy health treatments."

References 

Australian journalists
Living people
Year of birth missing (living people)